In mathematics, Anderson's theorem is a result in real analysis and geometry which says that the integral of an integrable, symmetric, unimodal, non-negative function f over an n-dimensional convex body K does not decrease if K is translated inwards towards the origin. This is a natural statement, since the graph of f can be thought of as a hill with a single peak over the origin; however, for n ≥ 2, the proof is not entirely obvious, as there may be points x of the body K where the value f(x) is larger than at the corresponding translate of x.

Anderson's theorem, named after Theodore Wilbur Anderson, also has an interesting application to probability theory.

Statement of the theorem
Let K be a convex body in n-dimensional Euclidean space Rn that is symmetric with respect to reflection in the origin, i.e. K = −K. Let f : Rn → R be a non-negative, symmetric, globally integrable function; i.e.
 f(x) ≥ 0 for all x ∈ Rn;
 f(x) = f(−x) for all x ∈ Rn;
 

Suppose also that the super-level sets L(f, t) of f, defined by

are convex subsets of Rn for every t ≥ 0. (This property is sometimes referred to as being unimodal.) Then, for any 0 ≤ c ≤ 1 and y ∈ Rn,

Application to probability theory
Given a probability space (Ω, Σ, Pr), suppose that X : Ω → Rn is an Rn-valued random variable with probability density function f : Rn → [0, +∞) and that Y : Ω → Rn is an independent random variable. The probability density functions of many well-known probability distributions are p-concave for some p, and hence unimodal. If they are also symmetric (e.g. the Laplace and normal distributions), then Anderson's theorem applies, in which case

for any origin-symmetric convex body K ⊆ Rn.

References
 

Theorems in geometry
Probability theorems
Theorems in real analysis